"Tropheryma whipplei" is a bacterium that is the causative organism of Whipple's disease, and rarely, endocarditis.

While "T. whipplei" is categorized with the Gram-positive Actinomycetota, the organism is commonly found to be Gram-positive or Gram-indeterminate when stained in the laboratory. Whipple himself probably observed the organisms as rod-shaped structures with silver stain in his original case.

History of the name
No name was given to the organism until 1991, when the name "Tropheryma whippelii" was proposed after sections of the bacterial genome were sequenced. The name was changed to "Tropheryma whipplei" in 2001 (correcting the spelling of Whipple's name) when the organism was deposited in bacterial collections.

As of 2008, the species, genus, and family name are considered to be invalid due to irregularities in the deposition of type material, and are thus styled in quotation marks.

Pathogenesis

Genome structure
Several strains of "T. whipplei" have been sequenced.

Genomes of intracellular or parasitic bacteria undergo massive reduction compared to their free-living relatives. With a genome size of less than 1 Mb, "T. whipplei" is a prime example of genome reduction among Actinomycetota. Other such examples include Mycoplasma for Bacillota (the low G+C content Gram-positive), Rickettsia for Alphaproteobacteria, and Wigglesworthia and Buchnera for Gammaproteobacteria.

Some of the largest virions like Megavirus chilensis, Pandoravirus, Pithovirus and mimivirus are comparable in size to miniature bacteria like "T. whipplei" and Rickettsia conorii.

References

Micrococcales
Bacteria described in 2001